is a Japanese gravure (bikini) idol from Chiba Prefecture, Japan. She has had a column since October 2007 in the monthly manga magazine Manga Life.

Biography

Two years after her last DVD, X-body, Harumi released the DVD called Surf Girl. She told the press at the DVD event that she intended to keep modeling.

References

Sources
 根本はるみ :: Harumi Nemoto Profile at yellow-cab.co.jp (Japanese)
 根本はるみ (Nemoto Harumi) Filmography at JMDB (Japanese)
 根本 はるみ - Nemoto Harumi Profile at Web I-dic (Japanese)

External links
 
 HarumiNemoto.com 根本はるみ - HarumiNemoto.com - Harumi Nemoto pictures, profile, videos
 

Japanese gravure idols
Japanese television personalities
1980 births
Living people
Models from Chiba Prefecture